The following is a list of Michigan State Historic Sites in Oakland County, Michigan. Sites marked with a dagger (†) are also listed on the National Register of Historic Places in Oakland County, Michigan. Those with a double dagger (‡) are also designated National Historic Landmarks.


Current listings

See also
 National Register of Historic Places listings in Oakland County, Michigan
 List of Michigan State Historical Markers in Oakland County

Sources
 Historic Sites Online – Oakland County. Michigan State Housing Developmental Authority. Accessed May 28, 2011.

References

 01
Oakland County
 01
Tourist attractions in Oakland County, Michigan